Lactuca tuberosa is an ornamental plant in the family Asteraceae.

References

Further reading

External links

 Genetic information of Steptorhamphus tuberosus

tuberosa